Rosemary Kurtz (born August 11, 1930) is an American educator and politician.

Born in Richmond, Indiana, Kurtz received her bachelor's degree from the University of Oklahoma  and her master's degree from the University of Kansas. She also studied at the University of Iowa. Kurtz taught in high school and college. Kurtz served as treasurer for the city of Crystal Lake, Illinois and on the Crystal Lake Zoning Board of Appeals. Kurtz served in the Illinois House of Representatives from 2001 to 2005 and was a Republican.

Notes

1930 births
2017 deaths
People from Richmond, Indiana
People from Crystal Lake, Illinois
University of Iowa alumni
University of Kansas alumni
University of Oklahoma alumni
Educators from Illinois
American women educators
Women state legislators in Illinois
Republican Party members of the Illinois House of Representatives
Educators from Indiana
21st-century American women